The EMD NW2 is a , B-B switcher locomotive manufactured by General Motors Electro-Motive Division of La Grange, Illinois. From February 1939 to December 1949, EMD produced 1,145 NW2s: 1,121 for U.S. and 24 for Canadian railroads. Starting in late 1948, the NW2s were manufactured in EMD's Plant #3 in Cleveland, Ohio. The locomotives were powered by a 12-cylinder model 567 engine and later a model 567A engine. In addition, EMD built three TR cow-calf paired sets, 36 TR2 cow-calf paired sets, and two TR3 cow-calf-calf sets. The TR sets were built before World War II; the TR2 and TR3 sets afterward.

Identification

Distinguishing features include two stacks in the middle of the hood, a half-height radiator grille, no sand box on the front platform, and no small louvers at the top front corners of the sides of the hood. The predecessor of the NW2 was the NW1. The "W" in both models stands for "welded frame".

Original owners

NW2

TR

TR2 (cow-calf)

TR3 (cow-calf-calf)

See also
 List of GM-EMD locomotives

References

 
 
 
 

B-B locomotives
Diesel-electric locomotives of the United States
NW2
Locomotives with cabless variants
Railway locomotives introduced in 1939
Standard gauge locomotives of the United States
Shunting locomotives